Nordisk is a Scandinavian word meaning Nordic.

It is commonly found in the names of various entities and organizations based in the Nordic countries, including:
 Nordisk Copyright Bureau, Danish copyright collecting society
 Nordisk Film, Danish film studio
 Nordisk Mobiltelefon, Swedish mobile telephone network operator
 Novo Nordisk, Danish pharmaceutical company
 Nordisk familjebok, Swedish encyclopedia